Nguyễn Thị Kim Ngân (born 12 April 1954, in Bến Tre Province) is a Vietnamese economist and politician. She is the first woman in Vietnamese history to head the country's legislature, serving as the eleventh Chair of the National Assembly of Vietnam from 2016 to 2021. She was a member of the 12th Politburo of the Communist Party, the country's highest decision-making body, in which she ranked second after General Secretary Nguyễn Phú Trọng. 

Ngân previously served in the cabinet of Nguyễn Tấn Dũng from 2006 to 2011 under various ministries. Prior to entering national politics, she held the post of Party Secretary (de facto Governor) of Hải Dương province from 2002 to 2006, being the first woman to hold this position and the only female provincial chief in Vietnam at that time.

Early life
Nguyễn Thị Kim Ngân was born on 12 April 1954 at the commune of Châu Hòa in Giồng Trôm District, Bến Tre Province. Her mother Nguyễn Thị Sang (died in 2006), commonly known as Má Sáu, is the secret basis of Bến Tre revolution. During the Vietnam War, her family was active in the National Front for the Liberation of South Vietnam. She was raised by her mother and educated in the territories controlled by the Republic of Vietnam. Her husband is Lê Trung Dũng.

Education
In 1973, she went to Saigon (nowadays Ho Chi Minh City) to study at the Saigon Literature College of the University of Saigon, but her studies were interrupted when the National Liberation Front took control of the South.

She later attended the University of Finance (nowadays the National Academy of Finance), earning a bachelor in financial management. Ngân also earned a master of economics in credit management at the University of Economics Ho Chi Minh City. She held an advanced degree in political theory.

In 2018, she was conferred the honorary doctorate in political science by the Pukyong National University in South Korea.

Career
After the unification of Vietnam, Nguyễn Thị Kim Ngân was transferred to the Ben Tre Finance Bureau (later renamed the Ben Tre Finance Department) to start her career in finance.

Nguyễn Thị Kim Ngân was admitted to the Communist Party of Vietnam on 9 December 1981 and became a full member of the Party a year later.

She graduated from the rank of Deputy Manager, Head of Department, Deputy Director, Acting Director and was officially appointed Director of Ben Tre Finance Department in October 1991. In April 1995, she was sent to the Central Government and was appointed Deputy Minister of Finance, serving until 2002.

In September 2002, she become the Party Secretary (de facto Governor) of Hải Dương province (2002-2006). Ngân was the first woman to hold this position and the only female provincial chief in Vietnam at that time.

In February 2006, she was briefly transferred to the Ministry of Finance before being appointed the Permanent Deputy Minister of Trade, serving from March 2006 to August 2007. She was then appointed by Nguyễn Tấn Dũng to head the Ministry of Labor, Invalids and Social Affairs, where she gained national prominence for playing a key role in the rescue of 10,000 Vietnamese migrant workers during the Libyan crisis in 2011.

In May 2011, she was elected Deputy Chair of the National Assembly. In 2013, she became a member of the 11th Politburo, the country's highest decision-making body. In 2016, she was elected Chair of the National Assembly, becoming the first woman in Vietnamese history to head the legislature and occupy one of the four pillars of leadership. She ranked second in the 12th Politburo after General Secretary Nguyễn Phú Trọng. 

In a YouGov survey in late 2020, Ngân was voted among the five most admired female figures among the Vietnamese public. She retired in March 2021.

References

External links

1954 births
Living people
Chairmen of the Standing Committee of the National Assembly (Vietnam)
Members of the 11th Politburo of the Communist Party of Vietnam
Members of the 12th Politburo of the Communist Party of Vietnam
Members of the 11th Secretariat of the Communist Party of Vietnam
Members of the 9th Central Committee of the Communist Party of Vietnam
Members of the 10th Central Committee of the Communist Party of Vietnam
Members of the 11th Central Committee of the Communist Party of Vietnam
Members of the 12th Central Committee of the Communist Party of Vietnam
People from Bến Tre Province
21st-century Vietnamese women politicians
21st-century Vietnamese politicians
Labour ministers of Vietnam